The 2017 Lao League was the 28th season of the Lao Premier League. The league was composed of  clubs starts on 1 April 2017. Lanexang United were the defending champions, having won their first league title in 2016.

Teams 
A total of 8 teams participated in the 2017 Lao League season, 1 promoted from the previous season of Lao Division 1 League. 6 teams withdrew from the league, including defending champions, Lanexang United after winning the 2016 season due to Laos match fixing  scandal.

Stadia
Note: Table lists in alphabetical order.

League table

References

External links 
Lao Football Federation website

Laos
Lao Premier League seasons